Alisa Vladimirovna Mon (born 15 August 1964) is a Soviet and Russian pop singer who became popular in the late 1980s after performing the song "Plantain". The second wave of popularity was associated with her 1997 hit "Diamond".

Early life 
She was born Svetlana Vladimirovna Bezukh in Slyudyanka, Irkutsk.

In 1983, in Novosibirsk, she entered the pop department at a music school. She worked as a singer in restaurants in Novosibirsk. In 1985 she became a soloist of the school's jazz orchestra. Subsequently, she left the educational institution without receiving secondary education (in her own words, she was expelled for incompetence ).

Career 
She took the pseudonym "Alice Mon", which is consonant with the word "Mona Lisa".

In 1988, the album "Take My Heart" was released. It also included the song "Plantain" (lyrics by Mikhail Tanich), which became the singer's first hit after her performance in the program " Song-1988 ". The festival brought the performer the Audience Award and all-Union popularity. In the late 1980s, the first big tour of the Labyrinth group took place.

In 2021, she appeared on the programme, Superstar! Return on the NTV channel. She also performed Can't Get You Out of My Head on the programme Showmaskgoonon the same channel.

In 2022, she performed as a cat as a special guest in the Russian version of The Masked Singer.

Personal life 
She lives in Moscow.

References

External links 
 Official website
 Apple Music
 Facebook

1964 births
Living people
People from Irkutsk Oblast
20th-century Russian singers
21st-century Russian singers
Soviet singers
Russian pop musicians